The Ferrovie dello Stato (FS; Italian State Railways) Class 740 is a class of 2-8-0 'Consolidation' steam locomotives.

Design and construction
The FS Class 740 locomotives were designed as the simple expansion and superheated version of the earlier FS Class 730; after the success of the FS Class 640. The first locomotives were built in 1911 and production continued (albeit with a long interruption caused by World War I) through to late 1923. In total, 470 were built, making the Class 740 the most numerous locomotive to be built for the Ferrovie dello Stato.

The first locomotives of the class were built with right-hand drive, but from 740.204 onwards this was changed to left-hand drive; some had six-wheeled tenders while others had bogeyed tenders giving a higher water capacity.

Operations
Built for heavy freight work, the Class 740 saw service across the whole FS network, with virtually any locomotive shed having had some of them assigned to it at some point; other than freight trains, they were also usually employed for passenger services on secondary lines. Having been built for wide route availability (and therefore requiring a low axle load), they are generally considered successful locomotives, well-suited for the role they were built for, although some have criticised their rather poor steaming.

The Class 740 remained in active service until the end of regular Italian steam in the 1970s. Some of the class were still assigned to various sheds as reserve motive power into the early 1990s.

Experiments and conversions

Caprotti valve gear
In 1921, locomotive 740.324 became the first FS locomotive to be fitted experimentally with Caprotti valve gear; the results were satisfactory, and locomotives 740.440–740.445 were modified during construction with the new valve gear and were classified in the separate Class 741, to be renumbered in 1930 as 740.691-697. An improved valve gear was fitted in 1932 to 740.352, which was renumbered 740.852; the valve gear was replaced by standard Walschaerts valve gear in 1955, and the remaining locomotives with Caprotti valve gear (which, although more efficient, required more refined maintenance) were withdrawn by the 1960s.

Franco-Crosti locomotives
In 1942, five 740 (numbers 339, 367, 392, 396 and 405) were rebuilt with a Franco-Crosti boiler, and fitted with a streamlined casing (more for aesthetical reasons than for any aerodynamic advantages). In 1951, these locomotives (with the casing removed) were renumbered into the FS Class 743, and 88 more were rebuilt until 1953. A modified version, with a single pre-heater under the boiler (instead of two placed alongside it), was classified as FS Class 741, and 81 of them were rebuilt between 1958 and 1960.

Preservation
Forty-nine Class 740 locomotives have survived into preservation. Three of them (the 740.278, 293 and 423) are currently operational and available for heritage trains, while others are under or awaiting restoration.

References

Further reading
 

740
2-8-0 locomotives
Gio. Ansaldo & C. locomotives
Breda locomotives
Henschel locomotives
Railway locomotives introduced in 1911
Standard gauge locomotives of Italy
1′D h2 locomotives
Freight locomotives